Grady Harwell Sutton (April 5, 1906 – September 17, 1995) was an American film and television character actor from the 1920s to the 1970s. He appeared in more than 180 films.

Early years 
Born in Chattanooga, Tennessee, Sutton was raised in Florida where he attended St. Petersburg High School.

Career 
Sutton began his career during the silent film era and made the transition to sound films with the college themed shorts The Boy Friends. He moved on to countless character roles, where he frequently played dimwitted country boys. His best-known roles were as Frank Dowling, Katharine Hepburn's dancing partner, in Alice Adams (1935) and as a foil to W.C. Fields in four films, The Pharmacist (1933), Man on the Flying Trapeze (1935), You Can't Cheat an Honest Man (1939), and The Bank Dick (1940).

Film historian William J. Mann characterizes Sutton as a typical "Hollywood Sissy," that is as a homosexual actor who ordinarily portrayed an effeminate character for comedic effect.

He continued to work throughout the 1950s and 1960s, finally retiring from acting in 1979. The strength of his association with Fields was such that it was mentioned in the commentary for My Fair Lady. Sutton has a non-speaking role in some of the formal-dress scenes, and subtly performs some comic shtick. The commentator refers to him as "an old W. C. Fields actor".

On television, Sutton appeared in an episode of  The Odd Couple, as well as some commercials.

Death 
On September 17, 1995, Sutton died at the Motion Picture & Television Country House and Hospital in Woodland Hills, California at the age of 89.

Filmography

Film

Television

References

Further reading

External links

Literature on Grady Sutton

1906 births
1995 deaths
American male film actors
American male silent film actors
American male television actors
People from Chattanooga, Tennessee
Male actors from Tennessee
American gay actors
20th-century American male actors
LGBT people from Tennessee
20th-century LGBT people